Senator Runner may refer to:

George Runner (born 1952), California State Senate
Sharon Runner (1954–2016), California State Senate
W. E. Runner (1851–1931), Washington State Senate